Peter D. Hart is the chairman of Peter D. Hart Research Associates since 1971, and is a senior counselor to TMG Strategies. Together with Robert Teeter or Bill McInturff, Hart and his company have provided NBC News and The Wall Street Journal with polls since 1989. More than 40 U.S. senators and 30 governors, among them Hubert Humphrey, Lloyd Bentsen, Jay Rockefeller and Bob Graham, have been represented by Hart Research.

NGOs and institutions like Smithsonian Institution, the United States Holocaust Memorial Museum, Habitat for Humanity, the ACLU, the Bill and Melinda Gates Foundation and the Kennedy Center are clients of Peter D. Hart Research Associates, as well as corporations such as Boeing, Time-Warner, American Airlines, Coca-Cola, IBM, Fannie Mae, AT&T, and Tiffany & Co. The book The Kennedy Half-Century includes references to his polling.

Hart received his BA at Colby College in 1964. During the last decade, Hart lectured public policy at Duke University's Sanford Institute of Public Policy, the Annenberg School for Communication at the University of Pennsylvania, the University of California, Berkeley's Travers Department of Political Science, and at the Harvard Kennedy School.

Hart is frequently invited to major television programs, such as Meet the Press, The Today Show, and The NewsHour with Jim Lehrer, to discuss public policy issues.

He resides in Washington, D.C. with his wife and has two children.

References

External links

Colby College alumni
Living people
American political consultants
Duke University faculty
University of California, Berkeley College of Letters and Science faculty
Pollsters
Year of birth missing (living people)